David Clayton Henrie (born July 11, 1989) is an American actor, writer, and director. He is noted for playing Ted Mosby's future son Luke on How I Met Your Mother and Justin Russo in Wizards of Waverly Place, as well as starring in the films Little Boy and Walt Before Mickey.

Early life
Henrie was born in Mission Viejo, California, to Linda Henrie (née Finocchiaro), a talent manager, and James Wilson Henrie, a producer formerly in real estate. He is the older brother of actor Lorenzo James Henrie. Henrie is of English, German, Swiss-German and Welsh descent on his father's side, and his maternal grandparents were Italian. Henrie was raised as a Roman Catholic, and, in a video chat, stated that he is "a Christian and always will be". He grew up in Phoenix, Arizona. On April 6, 2012, Good Friday, Henrie accompanied Eduardo Verástegui in a speech addressing life issues at the Church of the Most Blessed Sacrament in the city of Piura, Peru.

Career
At age 13, Henrie landed a regular role as Petey Pitt on the Fox sitcom The Pitts. Henrie next landed a leading role in the Hallmark movie, Monster Makers, with Linda Blair and George Kennedy, and was asked to come back for another Hallmark movie, to play a role in Dead Hollywood Moms Society. He also starred as Skylar Blaford in the Fox's sitcom Method & Red.

Henrie guest starred in many shows such as Providence, Without a Trace, The Mullets, Judging Amy, The D.A., Jack & Bobby, NCIS, House, and Cold Case. Before his role on Wizards of Waverly Place, he had a recurring role on That's So Raven as Cory's friend Larry. Henrie also had a recurring role on How I Met Your Mother, where he played Ted's future son.

At the age of 18, Henrie got the role of Justin Russo in the Disney Channel Original Series, Wizards of Waverly Place. The show premiered on October 12, 2007. He was in the movie Wizards of Waverly Place: The Movie with the cast of the series. Henrie played Justin Vincenzo Pepé Russo through the whole series. About a year after the finale, a film, The Wizards Return: Alex vs. Alex premiered on March 15, 2013, without Henrie, but his character was mentioned, and a photo of him is shown. Henrie is credited with writing two episodes of Wizards of Waverly Place, "Alex's Logo" and the series special "Meet the Werewolves".

He had a role in the Disney Channel Original Movie Dadnapped co-starring Emily Osment. Henrie made a guest appearance as himself in two episodes of Jonas. According to Reuters, Henrie was officially named the Grand Marshal for the 2009 Toyota Pro/Celebrity Race.

In 2010, Henrie guest-starred in the web series Easy to Assemble. In 2012, Henrie voiced the character of Shawn in the movie The Secret World of Arrietty.  

Henrie appeared in Grown Ups 2 (2013), opposite Taylor Lautner and Adam Sandler. In 2014, Henrie played the lead in 1000 to 1: The Cory Weissman Story, the true story of a young basketball player who suffered a catastrophic stroke as a freshman at Gettysburg College.  Later that year, Henrie guest starred in the ABC show Mind Games.

As of 2014, Henrie has directed two short films, Boo! and Catch.

In 2015, Henrie played the role of Lane, a valet who falls for Paul Blart's daughter, in the sequel Paul Blart: Mall Cop 2. He also co-starred as London Busbee, older brother of the title character, in the drama Little Boy, and had a role in the indie biographical drama film Walt Before Mickey in which he plays Rudy Ising, who worked for Walt Disney. Henrie had cameo appearances in indie drama Cardboard Boxer and Warrior Road.

In 2018, Henrie directed a coming-of-age film This Is the Year, which he also starred in and co-wrote. In August 2020, Henrie and his Wizards of Waverly Place co-star Selena Gomez, who served as executive producer on the film, announced the virtual movie premiere of This Is the Year.

Personal life 
In October 2016, Henrie became engaged to former Miss Delaware 2011, Maria Cahill. They were married on April 21, 2017. They have three children, a girl born in March 2019, a boy born in December 2020, and a girl born in July 2022. He is a practicing Roman Catholic.

Legal issues
On September 10, 2018, Henrie was arrested and charged at Los Angeles International Airport under allegations of carrying a loaded gun in the airport. He later released a statement on Twitter apologizing for the incident, stating that the act was unintentional and the gun was legally purchased. On September 26, 2018, it was reported Henrie was charged on three counts for "carrying a loaded firearm, carrying a concealed firearm, and possessing a weapon in a sterile area of the airport".

Filmography

Awards and nominations

References

External links

 
 

1989 births
Living people
21st-century American male actors
Male actors from California
American male child actors
American people of Italian descent
American people of English descent
American people of Swiss-German descent
American people of Welsh descent
American male film actors
American male television actors
Male actors from Phoenix, Arizona
People from Mission Viejo, California
Catholics from California